Christos Spirtzis (born 1969 in Athens) is a Greek engineer and centre-left independent politician. From 2015 to 2019, he served as the Minister of Infrastructure and Transport in the government of Alexis Tsipras.

Biography

Early life and education
Born 1969 in Athens and raised in the nearby Ampelokipoi, Spirtzis studied Electrical engineering at the Democritus University of Thrace.

Professional career
In 1999 he was appointed a member of the Economic and Social Committee of Greece, a post he would hold until 2008. One year later, in 2000, Spirtzis was elected to the executive committee of the Technical Chamber of Greece (TEE). In 2007, he became vice president responsible for energy, development, employment, insurance, licensing, publications, ethics in representation, and the databank. In September 2010, he was promoted to the post of the president of the chamber. Presiding over the Democratic Coalition of Technicians, he was re-elected as president of TEE in 2013. He also chairs the Hellenic National Committee at the World Energy Council.

Political career
Spirtzis, who has been described as a "child" of social-democratic PASOK, however wasn't hesitant to clash with his party, especially in strongly opposing the Memorandum. After the January 2015 legislative election, Spirtzis was appointed Alternate Minister of Infrastructure, Transport and Networks by the Syriza-led government of Alexis Tsipras. He was sworn in on 28 January 2015, one day later than most ministers, as the Council of State had to approve the merging of ministries first. Announcing that the government would stop the privatization of fourteen regional airports, he said: "The central position of the government is to stop the privatizations of infrastructure which serve and can help the development of the country."

References

External links
  

1969 births
Engineers from Athens
Living people
Democritus University of Thrace alumni
Greek electrical engineers
Syriza politicians
Government ministers of Greece
Greek MPs 2015–2019
Politicians from Athens
Greek MPs 2019–2023